Levin Winder (September 4, 1757 – July 1, 1819) in Baltimore, Maryland. During the Revolutionary War, he was appointed major of the 4th Maryland Regiment, finally attaining the rank of lieutenant colonel at war's end. After the war, he served with the Maryland Militia at the rank of brigadier general.

Winder served as the 14th governor of the state of Maryland in the United States from 1812 to 1816. He also served in the Maryland House of Delegates from 1789 to 1793.

Life 
Levin Winder was born in Somerset County on September 4, 1757, the son of William and Esther (Gillis) Winder, and a descendant of John Winder, who had emigrated from England in 1665. As a young man, he prepared to practice law until the outbreak of the war prevented him from doing so. Instead, he joined the army and on January 2, 1776, the Convention of Maryland appointed him a first lieutenant under Nathaniel Ramsey in the Fifth Company of the Maryland Line. On December 10 of the same year, he was promoted to captain, while on April 17, 1777 he became a major in the Fourth Regiment. He became a lieutenant colonel in the Second Regiment on June 3, 1781, subsequently transferring to the First Regiment, and was discharged from the service on November 15, 1783. Shortly thereafter, Winder was admitted as an original member of The Society of the Cincinnati of Maryland.

After his return home, he became a farmer on a large scale on his estate near Princess Anne. He never again resumed his law practice, even though he did devote many years of his life to public service.

For the next ten years, Winder devoted his attention to the operation of his plantation. On May 13, 1790, he married Mary Staughton Sloss. They had three children, all of whom survived their father.

In 1794, following the reorganization of the militia, Governor Lee appointed Winder a major general. In August of the same year, as the result of discontent which culminated in the Whiskey Rebellion, the President ordered the militia to enforce the federal laws to collect the tax upon distilled spirits. The Governor, consequently, ordered the militia to march to Western Maryland to prevent the insurrection from spilling over into Maryland from Pennsylvania. By the time the troops arrived, the rebellion had been quelled, and since Winder's force was not needed, he returned home where he was discharged from further duty.

In 1796, Winder made his first attempt at public office. In that year Somerset County chose him as one of its senatorial electors. He seems to have been inactive politically for several years. In 1801, 1806, and 1811, he again represented his county as a senatorial elector. In November 1806, his county elected him to the House of Delegates, where he served three terms. During the session of 1808, the Federalist majority chose him as its speaker.

As a Federalist, Winder opposed the declaration of war against Great Britain. After the Federal Republican and Commercial Gazette had published its anti-Republican editorial and the Republicans had failed to prosecute those responsible for the resulting riot, the Federalists under Winder, capitalized on popular reaction to capture the governorship. He qualified as an anti-war governor on November 23, 1812, bringing to the office with him an overwhelming majority of Federalist delegates. The Senate, however, was controlled by the Republicans.

Winder, after the British fleet had commenced its depredations in the Chesapeake Bay, attempted unsuccessfully to obtain help from the national government for the defense of the State. Winder hoped, although in vain, that the national government would have given Maryland 'some assurance of future protection and security.'  He defined the State's relationship to Washington as one in which the national government would "protect each state against invasion . . . and for that purpose every necessary power is delegated to the national authorities. The means of defence reserved to the state governments are very limited and their powers in the conduct of a war defined." He went on to say that the 'defence of the union and of the several parts of it have been committed to the general government, that all expenses incurred in affording protection by the various states, ought to be reimbursed by the United States.

Winder's pleas were to no avail. When it became apparent to him that Maryland would not receive any defense funds, he called the Legislature into special session on May 17, 1813. He reported to it that 'considerable alarms have pervaded the state, in consequence of the appearance of a large naval force within the waters of the Chesapeake.' He noted that he had attempted to repel any possible enemy invasion, 'and as our resources are too limited to afford complete protection,' he asked the legislature to take the necessary action. He had called the militia into [p. 67] active service, distributed swords and pistols, moved the public records to safety, and forwarded copies of his communications both to the Secretary of War as well as to the President. The legislature responded by the passage of legislation authorizing the calling out of the militia for the defense of Baltimore and the payment of its expenses, as well as that of approving the loan of money by the State's banks.  Both Baltimore and Annapolis were, consequently, garrisoned at the expense of Maryland.

While Winder was attempting to protect Maryland, he had to stand for re-election. In the fall election of 1813, there was a contested election for members of the House of Delegates from Allegany County. When the General Assembly voted for Governor on December 13 of that year, a number of the legislators refused to vote because of what they held to be an unjust ruling on the part of the Federalists. The Republicans had made repeated attempts to organize the House before the Allegany delegates could be seated, but their maneuvering was futile, and they were defeated. Winder was re-elected over his opponent, former Governor Bowie, despite the protests of the opposition.

In his annual message of that year, Winder reported upon the progress of the war. He referred to the removal of the records to Upper Marlboro by requesting the Legislature to make some further provision with regard to them since 'there is a considerable danger of their being lost or destroyed by frequent removals.' He complained bitterly against the militia system and noted that 'if the expenses of a war waged by the national authorities are to be borne by the States, it is not difficult to foresee that the state treasury will soon be exhausted, and the annihilation of the state governments must follow.' Winder also favored the adoption of a system of general education by hoping that the legislature would 'place the means of education within the reach of every description of the people.

"'Although' commented Brewer, 'the Federalists had opposed the war, they had not been adverse to leading it in the local field.' During Winder's second year in office, the British invaded Maryland and defeated the Americans decisively at Bladensburg. They then burned and looted Washington. Several weeks later, they turned their attention to Baltimore which the Americans defended heroically, and repulsed them. 'Baltimore's defense restored the young country's pride,' noted Muller.7 It also contributed to the writing of a treaty of peace which ended the unpopular war, and gave us our national anthem.

These military successes enhanced Winder's reputation even though Brewer called him a 'poor choice' as governor. In the fall election of 1814, Winder again defeated former Governor Bowie and served without [p. 68] incident until January 2, 1816 when he was succeeded by Charles Ridgely of Hampton.

Governor Winder had been elected the Most Worshipful Grand Master of Masons in Maryland in 1814 while he was still governor. In that connection, he performed two important ceremonies. He laid the cornerstone of the Washington Monument in Baltimore on July 4, 1815, as well as that of the old Masonic Hall in that city.

He died in Baltimore on July 1, 1819. At his death, the members of the Grand Lodge of A. F. & A. M. of Maryland passed resolutions lamenting 'the death of their late Most Worshipful Grand Master, Levin Winder, whose usefulness in the service of his country, and whose private virtues always reflected honour on this fraternity. Governor Winder was buried in the First Presbyterian Church graveyard on the corner of Fayette and Greene Streets in Baltimore. Later, his remains were removed to the family burying-ground on his family estate 'Monie Creek,' near Princess Anne.

References 

Frank F. White, Jr., The Governors of Maryland 1777-1970 (Annapolis:  The Hall of Records Commission, 1970), 65-68.
 Maryland State Archives

External links 

Governor Faced Hard Problems - Delmarva Heritage Series
 The Society of the Cincinnati
 The American Revolution Institute

1757 births
1819 deaths
American militia generals
Continental Army officers from Maryland
Governors of Maryland
Speakers of the Maryland House of Delegates
Maryland Federalists
Federalist Party state governors of the United States
American slave owners